GolTV was a Canadian English language Category B specialty channel. GolTV was exclusively dedicated to association football (soccer), with live and recorded sporting events from around the world, and news programs. GolTV was owned by Maple Leaf Sports & Entertainment (MLSE).

History

In August 2005, Insight Sports (on behalf of a corporation to be incorporated) was granted a television broadcasting licence by the Canadian Radio-television and Telecommunications Commission (CRTC) for The Soccer Net, described as "a national English-language Category 2 specialty programming undertaking devoted to soccer and soccer enthusiasts. The programming will focus on instruction from beginner to advanced play and on amateur and professional soccer games. All of the programming will be devoted to soccer or soccer-related subjects."

The channel was launched on November 1, 2005 as GolTV. At some point, GOL TV USA, a division of Tenfield, purchased a minority interest in the channel.

On November 7, 2007, GolTV provided live broadband coverage of the Vancouver Whitecaps FC’s friendly home game against David Beckham and the Major League Soccer’s Los Angeles Galaxy over the internet on a pay-per-view basis.

On January 23, 2009, Maple Leaf Sports and Entertainment, owners of Major League Soccer franchise Toronto FC (along with other major sports teams in the city), announced they would acquire Insight Sports' interest in GolTV. The deal was approved by the CRTC on June 2, 2009.  In 2015, MLSE reported to the CRTC that it had bought out GOL TV USA's stake in the channel.

On July 6, 2015, in a notice to revoke the license of GolTV Canada posted on the CRTC website, it was revealed that the channel would be ceasing operations on August 31, 2015. According to the timetable shown on their website, GolTV Canada would cease broadcasting on August 31, 2015 after it finished airing the whole third season of a Toronto FC documentary "All For One" starting at 9:30pm (Eastern Time), while their website would redirect to the Toronto FC's website.

Programming
GolTV Canada featured live and taped events from the following leagues and competitions:

 Brazil: Campeonato Brasileiro, Campeonato Carioca, Campeonato Paulista
 Canada / USA: Major League Soccer (including team-specific coverage of Toronto FC)
 Germany: Bundesliga
 Mexico: Liga de Ascenso (2nd division)
 France:  Coupe de France (final only), Trophée des Champions 
 Spain:  Copa del Rey (final only), Supercopa de España

GolTV broadcast international matches, including friendlies and qualifiers, including:

 CONCACAF: Women's Pre-Olympic Tournament
 CONMEBOL: South American Youth Championship
 FIFA: Selected matches for World Cup Qualifiers are broadcast live or delayed

Other programs

 Bundesliga Magazine
 Canadian Football Weekly
 Foot Brazil
 Football Today
 GolTV News
 Hallo Bundesliga
 Liga BBVA

 MLS Weekly
 Off The Pitch
 Oh My Gol!

Past programming
GolTV previously aired coverage of Spain's La Liga. Since mid-2012, the Canadian broadcast rights to that league have been owned by the upstart Al Jazeera-owned channel beIN Sport.

High definition
GolTV announced on December 5, 2011 that it would launch HD programming in partnership with the RealSports and Xbox 360. HD programming will be available via a free app for the Xbox 360 with a monthly subscription fee.

GolTV officially launched its HD service on television systems in November 2012 with EastLink. GolTV Canada HD was also available on Ch.428 on Rogers.

See also
 GOL TV (Latin American)
 GOL TV (United States)

References

Sports television networks in Canada
Soccer on Canadian television
Television channels and stations established in 2005
Television channels and stations disestablished in 2015
2005 establishments in Canada
2015 disestablishments in Canada
Digital cable television networks in Canada
Defunct television networks in Canada
English-language television stations in Canada
Spanish-language television stations
Maple Leaf Sports & Entertainment